Ramón Rossell Mas (born 24 June 1971) is an Andorran alpine skier. He competed at the 1992 Winter Olympics and the 1994 Winter Olympics.

Notes

References

External links
 
 

1971 births
Living people
Andorran male alpine skiers
Olympic alpine skiers of Andorra
Alpine skiers at the 1992 Winter Olympics
Alpine skiers at the 1994 Winter Olympics
People from Andorra la Vella